SMS S19 was a V1-class torpedo boat of the Imperial German Navy. The ship was built by Schichau-Werke, at their Elbing shipyard, completing in 1913. S19 served with the German High Seas Fleet during the First World War, taking part in the Battle of Jutland in 1916. The ship survived the war, serving in the Weimar Republic's Reichsmarine. She was scrapped in 1935.

Construction and design
In 1911, the Imperial German Navy decided to break the pattern of each year's orders of torpedo boats being a development of the previous year's designs, as it felt that they were getting too big to work for the fleet, and instead the 12 torpedo boats (six each ordered from AG Vulcan and Germaniawerft) (the V1-class) were smaller than those ordered in recent years in order to be more manoeuvrable and so work better with the fleet. This change resulted in the numbering series for torpedo boats being restarted. The 1912 programme placed orders for a flotilla of 12 torpedo boats of similar design ( to ) with Schichau-Werke. The reduction in size resulted in the ships' seaworthiness being adversely affected, however, and range being reduced, with the 1911 and 1912 torpedo boats acquiring the disparaging nickname "Admiral Lans' cripples".

S19s armament consisted of two  SK L/30 naval guns in single mounts fore and aft, together with four 50 cm (19.7 in) torpedo tubes with one reload torpedo carried. Up to 18 mines could be carried. The ship had a crew of 74 officers and other ranks. In 1916, the guns were replaced by more powerful 8.8 cm SK L/45 naval guns.

S19, yard number 870, was launched at Schichau's shipyard in Elbing, East Prussia (now Elbląg in Poland) on 17 October 1912 and was commissioned on 29 March 1913.

Service
In May 1914, S19 was the leader of the 14th half-flotilla of the 7th Torpedo boat Flotilla.

First World War
S19 remained a member of the 14th half-flotilla of the 7th Flotilla, part of the German High Seas Fleet, at the outbreak of the First World War in August 1914. The 7th Torpedo Boat Flotilla supported the Raid on Yarmouth on 3 November 1914 and the Raid on Scarborough, Hartlepool and Whitby on 16 December 1914. On 21 April 1915, S19 was one of three torpedo-boats of the 14th half-flotilla that encountered the light cruisers of IV Scouting Group near the Weser estuary. The torpedo boat  collided with the cruiser , with S21 being cut in two. The stern half of S21 remained afloat for some time, but attempts by the other two torpedo boats to take it in tow failed. S19 was damaged by the sinking S21s propeller, and had to return to port for repair. 36 men were killed in the sinking of S21. In May 1915, in support of the Gorlice–Tarnów offensive on the Eastern Front, Germany launched an attack against Libau (now Liepāja) in Latvia, with naval support from the German navy. The 14th half-flotilla, including S19, formed part of a force of four light cruisers and 21 torpedo boats detached from the High Seas Fleet in support of the Baltic operations. They were used to prevent interference by the Russian navy with the operations, patrolling between Ösel and Gotska Sandön and between Gotska Sandön and the Swedish coast. The force detached from the High Seas Fleet was recalled to the North Sea soon after Libau was captured on 8 May.

S19, as part of the 7th Flotilla, was part of the High Seas Fleet when it sailed to cover the Lowestoft Raid on 24–25 April 1916. At the Battle of Jutland on 31 May–1 June 1916, S19 was still part of the 14th half-flotilla of the 7th Torpedo boat Flotilla, operating in support of the main German battle fleet. During the night action, the 7th Flotilla was ordered to search for and attack the British fleet, being allocated the sector to the south-east of the German fleet. As the British fleet had a night cruising speed of 17 knots, this would limit the 7th Flotilla's effectiveness. S19 did not encounter any British ships during the night. S19 was transferred to an escort flotilla in 1917, remaining part of the 1st half-flotilla of the 1st Escort Flotilla at the end of the First World War.

Postwar service
The Treaty of Versailles allowed the Weimar Republic's Reichsmarine to retain a total of 12 destroyers and 12 torpedo boats in active service, with a further 4 ships of each type that could be held in reserve, with no stores or ammunition on board. S19 was selected as one of the reserve destroyers,  being laid up at Kiel. S19 was stricken on 31 May 1931, before being sold on 4 February 1935 and being scrapped by Deutsche Werke at their Kiel works.

Notes

References

Bibliography
 
 
 
 
 
 
 
 
 
 
 
 
 

Torpedo boats of the Imperial German Navy
1912 ships
World War I torpedo boats of Germany
V1-class destroyers